Poets House is a national literary center and poetry library based in New York City. It contains more than 70,000 volumes of poetry, and is free and open to the public. Following the COVID-19 pandemic, they temporarily suspended operations in November 2020.

History
Poets House was founded in 1985 by the late Stanley Kunitz, two-time poet laureate of the United States, and arts administrator Elizabeth Kray.
Poets House contains virtually all poetry books published in the U.S. since 1990, plus many that are long out of print dating to the early 20th Century. It also contains literary journals and chapbooks (small books of poetry), and many audiotapes, videotapes, CDs, and DVDs of poetry readings from the mid-twentieth century through today. Visitors to Poets House can hear the voices of Walt Whitman, E. E. Cummings, William Carlos Williams, Sylvia Plath and hundreds of other poets.

In 2005, it was among 406 New York City arts and social service institutions to receive part of a $20 million grant from the Carnegie Corporation, which was made possible through a donation by New York City mayor Michael Bloomberg.

In 1996, the literary newspaper Poetry Flash called Poets House "The House That Holds A Country," a reference to its dedication to being a caretaker of the nation's poetic heritage.

In November 2020, Poets House announced it was suspending operations as a result of the economic impact of COVID-19. In 2021, the building was damaged by a flood, although the library was intact. They plan to reopen in Spring 2023.

Building
In 2009, Poets House moved from its longstanding location in SoHo to an eco-friendly "green" building at Ten River Terrace in Lower Manhattan's Battery Park City. The move was facilitated via long-term lease awarded by the Battery Park City Authority.

The space's interiors were designed by architect Louise Braverman, and is on two floors covering  that opens onto an extension of Teardrop Park.

In 2021, the building was damaged by a flood, although the library was intact. They plan to reopen in Spring 2023.

References

External links
 
 Poets House catalogue

American poetry
Poetry organizations